Masjid al-Haram, also known as the Grand Mosque or the Great Mosque of Mecca, is a mosque enclosing the vicinity of the Kaaba in Mecca, in the Mecca Province of Saudi Arabia. It is a site of pilgrimage in the Hajj, which every Muslim must do at least once in their lives if able, and is also the main phase for the ʿUmrah, the lesser pilgrimage that can be undertaken any time of the year. The rites of both pilgrimages include circumambulating the Kaaba within the mosque. The Great Mosque includes other important significant sites, including the Black Stone, the Zamzam Well, Maqam Ibrahim, and the hills of Safa and Marwa.

 the Great Mosque is the largest mosque in the world. It has undergone major renovations and expansions through the years. It has passed through the control of various caliphs, sultans and kings, and is now under the control of the King of Saudi Arabia who is titled the Custodian of the Two Holy Mosques.

History

The great Mosque contends with the Mosque of the Companions in the Eritrean city of Massawa and Quba Mosque in Medina as the oldest mosque. According to Islamic tradition, Islam as a religion precedes Muhammad, representing previous prophets such as Abraham. Abraham is credited by Muslims with having built the Kaaba in Mecca, and consequently its sanctuary, which according to the Muslim view is seen as the first mosque that ever existed. According to other scholars, Islam started during the lifetime of Muhammad in the 7th century CE, and so did architectural components such as the mosque. In that case, either the Mosque of the Companions or Quba Mosque would be the first mosque that was built in the history of Islam.

Era of Abraham and Ishmael
According to Islamic doctrine in the Quran, Abraham together with his son Ishmael raised the foundations of a house, which has been identified by commentators as the Kaaba. God showed Abraham the exact site which was previously built by Adam, very near to what is now the Well of Zamzam, where Abraham and Ishmael began work on the construction of the Kaaba. After Abraham had built the Kaaba, an angel brought to him the Black Stone, a celestial stone that, according to tradition, had fallen from Heaven on the nearby hill Abu Qubays. The Black Stone is believed by Islamic scholars to be the only remnant of the original structure made by Abraham.

After placing the Black Stone in the Eastern corner of the Kaaba, Abraham received a revelation, in which God told the aged prophet that he should now go and proclaim the pilgrimage to mankind, so that men may come both from Arabia and from lands far away, on camel and on foot.

Era of Muhammad
Upon Muhammad's victorious return to Mecca in 630 CE, he broke the idols in and around the Kaaba, similar to what, according to the Quran, Abraham did in his homeland. Thus ended polytheistic use of the Kaaba, and began monotheistic rule over it and its sanctuary.

Umayyad era
The first major renovation to the mosque took place in 692 on the orders of Abd al-Malik ibn Marwan. Before this renovation, which included the mosque's outer walls being raised and decoration added to the ceiling, the mosque was a small open area with the Kaaba at the center. By the end of the 8th century, the mosque's old wooden columns had been replaced with marble columns and the wings of the prayer hall had been extended on both sides along with the addition of a minaret on the orders of Al-Walid I. The spread of Islam in the Middle East and the influx of pilgrims required an almost complete rebuilding of the site which included adding more marble and three more minarets.

Ottoman era
In 1570, Sultan Selim II commissioned the chief architect Mimar Sinan to renovate the mosque. This renovation resulted in the replacement of the flat roof with domes decorated with calligraphy internally, and the placement of new support columns which are acknowledged as the earliest architectural features of the present mosque. These features are the oldest surviving parts of the building.

During heavy rains and flash floods in 1621 and 1629, the walls of the Kaaba and the mosque suffered extensive damage. In 1629, during the reign of Sultan Murad IV, the mosque was renovated. In the renovation of the mosque, a new stone arcade was added, three more minarets (bringing the total to seven) were built, and the marble flooring was retiled. This was the unaltered state of the mosque for nearly three centuries.

Saudi era

First Saudi expansion
The first major renovation under the Saudi kings was done between 1955 and 1973. In this renovation, four more minarets were added, the ceiling was refurnished, and the floor was replaced with artificial stone and marble. The Mas'a gallery (As-Safa and Al-Marwah) is included in the Mosque, via roofing and enclosures. During this renovation many of the historical features built by the Ottomans, particularly the support columns, were demolished.

On 20 November 1979, the Great Mosque was seized by extremist insurgents who called for the overthrow of the Saudi dynasty. They took hostages and in the ensuing siege hundreds were killed. These events came as a shock to the Islamic world, as violence is strictly forbidden within the mosque.

Second Saudi expansion
The second Saudi renovations under King Fahd, added a new wing and an outdoor prayer area to the mosque. The new wing, which is also for prayers, is reached through the King Fahd Gate. This extension was performed between 1982 and 1988.

1987 to 2005 saw the building of more minarets, the erecting of a King's residence overlooking the mosque and more prayer area in and around the mosque itself. These developments took place simultaneously with those in Arafat, Mina and Muzdalifah. This extension also added 18 more gates, three domes corresponding in position to each gate and the installation of nearly 500 marble columns. Other modern developments added heated floors, air conditioning, escalators and a drainage system.

Third Saudi expansion
In 2008, the Saudi government under King Abdullah Ibn Abdulaziz announced an expansion of the mosque, involving the expropriation of land to the north and northwest of the mosque covering . At that time, the mosque covered an area of  including indoor and outdoor praying spaces. 40 billion riyals (US$10.6 billion) was allocated for the expansion project.

In August 2011, the government under King Abdullah announced further details of the expansion. The circumambulation areas (Mataf) around the Kaaba would be expanded and all closed spaces receive air conditioning. After completion, it would raise the mosque's capacity from 770,000 to over 2.5 million worshippers. The project was carried out by the Saudi Binladin Group. In 2012, the Abraj Al Bait complex was completed along with the 601 meter tall Makkah Royal Clock Tower. 

On 11 September 2015, at least 111 people died and 394 were injured when a crane collapsed onto the mosque. Construction work was suspended after the incident, and remained on hold due to financial issues during the 2010s oil glut. Development was eventually restarted two years later in September 2017.

On 5 March 2020, during the COVID-19 pandemic, the mosque began to be closed at night and the Umrah pilgrimage was suspended to limit attendance. The resumption of Umrah service began on 4 October 2020 with the first phase of a gradual resumption that was limited to Saudi citizens and expatriates from within the Kingdom at a rate of 30 per cent. Only 10,000 people were given Hajj visas in 2020 while 60,000 people were given visas in 2021.

List of former and current Imams

Former Imams
Imams:

 Abdullah Al-Khulaifi, appointed Imam and Khateeb from 1953 till his death in 1993.
 Ahmad Khatib, Islamic Scholar from Indonesia
 Ali bin Abdullah Jaber, Imam from 1981 to 1983, guest Imam for Ramadhan 1986–1989
 Umar Al-Subayyil, Imam and Khateeb from 1993 until 2002, died in 2002
 Mohammad Al Subail, died in 2012
 Abdullah Al-Harazi, former Chairman of Saudi Majlis al-Shura
 Ali bin Abdur-Rahman Al-Huthaify, guest Imam for Ramadhan 1981, 1985–1986, 1988–1991, now Chief Imam of The Prophet's Mosque 
 Salah ibn Muhammad Al-Budair, led Taraweeh in Ramadan 1426 (2005) and 1427 (2006), now Deputy Chief Imam of The Prophet's Mosque
 Adil al-Kalbani
 Saleh Al-Talib (suspended)
 Khalid al Ghamdi (suspended)

Current Imams
 Abdul-Rahman Al-Sudais, appointed as Imam and Khateeb in 1404 (1984).
 Saud Al-Shuraim, appointed as Imam and Khateeb in 1412 (1992).
 Salih bin Abdullah al Humaid, appointed as Imam and Khateeb in 1404 (1984).
 Usama Abdul Aziz Al-Khayyat, appointed as Imam and Khateeb in 1418 (1998).
 Abdullah Awad Al Juhany, appointed as Imam in 1428 (2007) and Khateeb in 1441 (2019).
 Mahir Al-Muayqali, appointed as Imam in 1428 (2007), and Khateeb in 1437 (2016).
 Yasser Al-Dosari, appointed as Imam in 1441.
 Bandar Baleelah, appointed as Imam in 1434 (2013), and Khateeb in 1441 (2019).
 Faisal Jameel Ghazzawi, appointed as Imam and Khateeb in 1429 (2008).

Pilgrimage

The Great Mosque is the main setting for the Hajj and Umrah pilgrimages that occur in the month of Dhu al-Hijja in the Islamic calendar and at any time of the year, respectively. The Hajj pilgrimage is one of the Pillars of Islam, required of all able-bodied Muslims who can afford the trip. In recent times, over 5 million Muslims perform the Hajj every year.

Structures
 The Ka'aba is a cuboid-shaped building in the center of the Great Mosque and the most sacred site in Islam. It is the focal point for Islamic rituals like prayer and pilgrimage.
 The Black Stone is the eastern cornerstone of the Kaaba and plays a role in the pilgrimage.
 Maqam Ibrahim is a rock that reportedly has an imprint of Abraham's foot and is kept in a crystal dome next to the Kaaba.
 Safa and Marwa are two hills between which Abraham's wife [Hajra] ran, looking for water for her infant son Ismael, an event which is commemorated in the  ritual of the pilgrimage. [Sa'aee]
 The Zamzam Well is the water source which, according to tradition, sprang miraculously after Hajra was unable to find water between Safa and Marwah.
 Nearby is Makkah Al Mukarramah Library. Since it is believed to stand on the spot where Muhammad was born, it is also known as Bayt al-Mawlid.

Destruction of heritage sites

There has been some controversy that the expansion projects of the mosque and Mecca itself are causing harm to early Islamic heritage. Many ancient buildings, some more than a thousand years old, have been demolished to make room for the expansion. Some examples are:
 , the Islamic school where Muhammad first taught, was flattened to lay marble tiles.
 The house of Abu Jahal has been demolished and replaced by public washrooms.
 A dome that served as a canopy over the Well of Zamzam was demolished.
 Some Ottoman portico's at the Mosque were demolished.

See also

Al-Aqsa Mosque
Holiest sites in Islam
Ḥ-R-M
Haram (site)
List of mosques
 List of mosques in Saudi Arabia
List of the oldest mosques
 Lists of mosques

Further reading 
 Online
 Great Mosque of Mecca: mosque, Mecca, Saudi Arabia, in Encyclopædia Britannica Online, by The Editors of Encyclopaedia Britannica, Surabhi Sinha, Noah Tesch, Amy Tikkanen, Grace Young and Adam Zeidan

References

External links

Official website

 
Islamic holy places
Religious buildings and structures converted into mosques
Arabic architecture